Irma Elsa Gonzalez (born March 29, 1948) is a retired United States federal judge of the United States District Court for the Southern District of California, who was the first Mexican-American female federal judge. She is married to former federal prosecutor and trial attorney Robert S. Brewer Jr. who is currently serving as the U.S. Attorney for Southern California.

She was an assistant U.S. Attorney of Criminal Division, U.S. Attorney's Office, District of Arizona from 1975 to 1979. She was a Trial attorney of U.S. Department of Justice, Antitrust Division, Los Angeles, California in 1979. She was an assistant U.S. Attorney of Criminal Division, U.S. Attorney's Office, Central District of California from 1979 to 1981. She was in private practice of law in San Diego, California from 1981 to 1984. She was a judge on the California Superior Court, San Diego County from 1991 to 1992.

Gonzalez was a federal judge on the United States District Court for the Southern District of California. Gonzalez was nominated by President George H. W. Bush on April 9, 1992, to a seat vacated by J. Lawrence Irving. She was confirmed by the United States Senate on August 11, 1992, and received commission on August 12, 1992. Served as chief judge, 2005–present.

Education and early career

Born in Palo Alto, California, Gonzalez completed a Bachelor of Arts degree at Stanford University in 1970, and a Juris Doctor at the University of Arizona College of Law (now known as the James E. Rogers College of Law) in 1973. She clerked for Judge William C. Frey of the United States District Court for the District of Arizona from 1973 to 1975. Gonzalez worked as an Assistant United States Attorney for the United States Attorney for Arizona from 1975 to 1979, and then for the Central District of California from 1979 to 1981. She was in private practice in San Diego from 1981 to 1984.

Judicial service

Gonzalez served as a United States magistrate judge for the United States District Court for the Southern District of California in 1984. California Governor Pete Wilson appointed Gonzalez as a state judge on the San Diego Superior Court in 1991.

On April 9, 1992, President George H. W. Bush nominated Gonzales to be a United States district judge of the United States District Court for the Southern District of California, to fill the seat vacated by Judge J. Lawrence Irving. The Senate confirmed her nomination on August 11, 1992 and she received her commission on August 12, 1992. She served as the Chief Judge of the Southern District from 2005 to 2012. Gonzalez took senior status on March 29, 2013, and retired on October 25, 2013.

On August 23, 2010 Gonzalez sided with Trump University in Makaeff vs. Trump University by allowing the countersuit by Trump University for defamation against Makaeff. Gonzalez's decision was unanimously overturned by the Ninth Circuit Court of Appeal on April 17, 2013.

See also
List of first women lawyers and judges in the United States
List of Hispanic/Latino American jurists

References

Sources
 

1948 births
Living people
20th-century American judges
20th-century American women judges
21st-century American judges
American judges of Mexican descent
American lawyers of Mexican descent
Assistant United States Attorneys
Hispanic and Latino American judges
James E. Rogers College of Law alumni
Judges of the United States District Court for the Southern District of California
Stanford University alumni
Superior court judges in the United States
United States district court judges appointed by George H. W. Bush
United States magistrate judges
21st-century American women judges